Clifford Smith may refer to:
 Clifford Smith (director), (1894-1937), American film director
 Clifford V. Smith, Jr. (born 1931), chancellor of University of Wisconsin–Milwaukee, 1986–1990
 Clifford Smith (cricketer) (1902–1959), English cricketer
 Method Man (born 1971), rapper
 Mr. Vegas (born 1974), dancehall star

See also
 Cliff Smith (disambiguation)
 Clifford Smyth (born 1934), historian and politician